L'Alsace-Le Pays is a regional daily French newspaper. L'Alsace covers the Alsace region and Le Pays the Franche-Comté region.

History and profile
L'Alsace-Le Pays was created in November 1944. In addition to its headquarters in Mulhouse, L'Alsace-Le Pays has 15 local agencies in the Haut-Rhin département (Altkirch, Cernay, Colmar, Guebwiller, Masevaux, Mulhouse, Saint-Louis, Sainte-Marie-aux-Mines, Thann and Wittelsheim), two in the Bas-Rhin département (Sélestat and Strasbourg), one in the Territoire de Belfort département (Belfort), one in the Doubs département (Montbéliard), and one in the Haute-Saône département (Lure).

A French-German bilingual edition is also published, representing 4.72 percent of the newspaper's global sales in 2003. The publishing director and manager of the paper is Jean-Dominique Pretet.

References

External links
 L'Alsace official website
 Le Pays official website

1944 establishments in France
Mass media in Mulhouse
Daily newspapers published in France
Publications established in 1944